Karen Burns may refer to:

 Karen Burns (academic) (born 1962), architectural historian and theorist
 Karen Ramey Burns (?–2012), American forensic anthropologist